The MJHL Playoff Most Valuable Player Award is presented to the player judged most valuable player to his team in each season's Manitoba Junior Hockey League ice hockey playoff competition.

MJHL Playoff MVP

External links
Manitoba Junior Hockey League
Manitoba Hockey Hall of Fame
Hockey Hall of Fame
Winnipeg Free Press Archives

Play